Laced with Romance is the debut album by American indie/garage rock band The Ponys.

Track listing
All songs written by Jered Gummere, Melissa Elias, Nathan Jerde, and Ian Adams.
"Lets Kill Ourselves" - 3:33  
"10 Fingers 11 Toes" - 3:34  
"Sad Eyes" - 4:00  
"Little Friends" - 3:28    
"Fall Inn" - 3:35  
"Looking Out A Mirror" - 3:44    
"Trouble Trouble" - 3:33   
"Chemical Imbalance" - 3:06  
"I'll Make You A Star" - 5:43  
"I Love You 'Cause (You Look Like Me)" - 2:35 
"Virus Human" - 2:28  
"The Only One" - 6:19

References 

2004 debut albums
The Ponys (band) albums
In the Red Records albums